= Endless Plans =

Tabletop fantasy role-playing game supplement

- Publishers: Endless Games
- Publication: 1982; 43 years ago
- Genres: Fantasy
- Systems: Systemless

Endless Plans is a supplement for fantasy role-playing games published by Endless Games in 1982.

== Contents ==
Endless Plans are floor plans for role-playing games, and to assist the gamemaster they come printed with feint dots at 2 scale-meter intervals.

== Publication history ==
Endless Plans was produced as a total of eight sets.

== Reception ==
Doug Cowie reviewed Endless Plans for Imagine magazine, and stated that "Many will prefer the rather stark EP approach. One big plus EPs have [over] other sets is the inclusion of a useful instruction pamphlet."

In the February 1987 edition of Adventurer (Issue 7), David Michaels liked the floor plans included in the adventure The Watchers of the Sacred Flame, which he stated "serve as an excellent introduction to the Endless Plans system, one which I praise for their flexibility and usability. In this instance, they add to the convenience of play and the sense of 'being there'."
